Crystal Sky is the fourth studio album by German singer Lena Meyer-Landrut. It was released on digital retailers on 15 May 2015 via We Love Music and Universal Music. The album includes productions by Biffco and Beatgees. The sound is described as electronic sounds with pop influences. The lead single "Traffic Lights" was released in native Germany and across Europe on 1 May 2015. Crystal Sky peaked number 2 on the German albums chart.

Background
In early 2014, Meyer-Landrut began principal work on her fourth studio album. In January, she traveled to New York City to engage in talks with record producer Bosko. In May 2014, she visited the Yoad Nevo studios in London and in June 2014. she worked with Australian singer-songwriter Kat Vinter in Berlin and with Israeli-American singer-songwriter Rosi Golan in Los Angeles. In Brighton, she worked with the Biffco producer team. Further she worked with AFSHeeN and Berlin production team Beatgees who already produced a remix of "Neon (Lonely People)" and the children's song "Schlaft alle" for the compilation album Giraffenaffen 3 which was released in November 2014. On 7 August 2014, Meyer-Landrut revealed via her Twitter account that the title of the album would be Crystal Sky.

Release and promotion
"Traffic Lights" was released as the lead single ahead of the album on 1 May 2015. The song entered the German singles chart at #14. The album followed two weeks later on CD, digital and limited CD+DVD version featuring music videos.

The next single "Wild & Free was released in September and served as the title track of the German comedy film Fack ju Göhte 2 (2015). It was later included on the deluxe CD+DVD version of the album released on 23 October 23, 2015.

"Beat to My Melody" was released as the third and final single from the album. A Remix EP was released on 8 April 2016 via Universal Music.

In 2017 Crystal Sky was reissued with additional bonus tracks from previous Lena albums.

Track listing
All tracks produced by Biffco and Beatgees, with dditional programming by Steven Malcolmson. Original production on "Lifeline" by AFSHeen and Josh Cumbee.

Charts

Weekly charts

Release history

References

External links
 

2015 albums
Lena Meyer-Landrut albums
Albums produced by Ash Howes
Albums produced by Richard Stannard (songwriter)